Abul Hasan (born 5 August 1992) is a Bangladeshi cricketer. He is a bowling allrounder. He is a right-arm medium-fast bowler and a robust left-handed lower-order batsman.

International career 
Hasan has played Tests, One Day Internationals and Twenty20 Internationals for the Bangladesh national team. In his first Test, against the West Indies in Khulna in November 2012, he became only the fourth player to make a century batting at number 10, and the second to do so on debut - the first being Australia's Reggie Duff in 1902. Hasan made 113 from 123 balls, and added 184 for the ninth wicket with Mahmudullah, which is the highest ninth wicket partnership for Bangladesh in Test. By coincidence, he conceded 113 runs when bowling in the West Indies' first innings.

Domestic career 
Domestically, Hasan plays for Sylhet Division, though he played for Duronto Rajshahi during the second season of the Bangladesh Premier League in 2013.

In February 2018, Hasan and Taibur Rahman scored 136 runs for the eighth wicket for Kala Bagan Krira Chakra against Khelaghar Samaj Kallyan Samity in the 2017–18 Dhaka Premier Division Cricket League. Before the partnership, Kala Bagan Krira Chakra were 34 for 7 in the eleventh over of the match. This was the first partnership of more than 100 runs for a team seven wickets down for fewer than 100 runs in List A cricket in Bangladesh. He finished the tournament as the leading wicket-taker for Kala Bagan Krira Chakra, with 11 dismissals in 10 matches.

In October 2018, he was named in the squad for the Rangpur Riders team, following the draft for the 2018–19 Bangladesh Premier League.

References

External links
 

Living people
1992 births
Bangladeshi cricketers
Bangladesh Test cricketers
Bangladesh One Day International cricketers
Bangladesh Twenty20 International cricketers
Cricketers who made a century on Test debut
Sylhet Division cricketers
Abahani Limited cricketers
Legends of Rupganj cricketers
Bangladesh East Zone cricketers
Dhaka Dominators cricketers
Rajshahi Royals cricketers
Sylhet Strikers cricketers
Rangpur Riders cricketers
Kala Bagan Krira Chakra cricketers
People from Kulaura Upazila